Auguste Dussourd (born 10 February 1996 in Nogent-sur-Marne) is a French professional squash player. As of May 2019, he was ranked number 77 in the world.

References

1996 births
Living people
French male squash players
21st-century French people